Barracudasauroides is a genus of mixosaurid ichthyosaur which lived during the Middle Triassic. Fossils of this genus have been found in Guizhou Province, China. It is known from GMPKU-P-1033, a partial skeleton recovered from the Upper Member of the Guanling Formation of Yangjuan village, Xinmin area; this rock unit dates to the Pelsonian substage of the Anisian stage. It was named by Michael W. Maisch in 2010, and the type species is Barracudasauroides panxianensis.

See also
 List of ichthyosaurs
 Timeline of ichthyosaur research

References

Middle Triassic ichthyosaurs
Middle Triassic reptiles of Asia
Fossil taxa described in 2010
Anisian life
Guanling Formation
Ichthyosauromorph genera